Trochanteria is a genus of spiders in the family Trochanteriidae. It was first described in 1878 by Karsch. , it contains 3 South American species.

References

Trochanteriidae
Araneomorphae genera
Spiders of South America